A font in typography is a complete character set in a particular point size, in a particular typeface.

Font may also refer to:

Religion
 Holy water font, a vessel for holy water, often seen at the entrance of a church
 Baptismal font, a container for holy water used in the Christian ceremonial of baptism

People with the surname
 Héctor Font (born 1984), Spanish footballer
 Pedro Font (1737-1781), Franciscan missionary and diarist

Locations
 Font, Switzerland, a municipality of the canton of Fribourg
 Font Hill Beach, a beach on the south coast of Jamaica
 La Font de la Figuera, a municipality in Spain
 La Font de la Guatlla, a neighborhood in Barcelona, Spain
 La Font d'En Carròs, a municipality in Spain
 River Font, a river in Northumberland, England

Other
 Computer font, a digital data file containing a set of graphically related glyphs, characters, or symbols 
 Fountain (archaic usage, also spelled fount)
 Kerosene lamp font, the container at the base of an oil or kerosene lamp that holds the oil, also spelled fount